Absalom Manyana Kamutyasha Iimbondi (born 11 October 1991) is a Namibian football player. Some sources list his last name as Limbondi. He plays for United Africa Tigers.

International
He made his Namibia national football team debut on 4 July 2015 in a CHAN 2016 qualifier against Zambia.

He was selected for the 2019 Africa Cup of Nations squad.

International goals
Scores and results list Namibia's goal tally first.

References

External links
 
 

1991 births
People from Oshana Region
Living people
Namibian men's footballers
Namibia international footballers
Association football forwards
United Africa Tigers players
Mochudi Centre Chiefs SC players
Namibia Premier League players
Namibian expatriate footballers
Expatriate footballers in Botswana
2019 Africa Cup of Nations players
Namibia A' international footballers
2018 African Nations Championship players
Namibian expatriate sportspeople in Botswana
2020 African Nations Championship players